Frank George Mario (February 25, 1921 — June 18, 1995) was a Canadian professional ice hockey player who played 53 games in the National Hockey League with the Boston Bruins between 1941 and 1945. The rest of his career, which lasted from 1941 to 1954, was mainly spent with the Hershey Bears in the minor American Hockey League.

Mario scored nine NHL goals, the first of which came on January 25, 1942 in Boston's 7-3 home win over the Montreal Canadiens.

Career statistics

Regular season and playoffs

References 

1921 births
1995 deaths
Boston Bruins players
Canadian ice hockey centres
Hershey Bears players
Ice hockey people from Saskatchewan
People from Esterhazy, Saskatchewan
Canadian expatriates in the United States